The Fiery Cavalcade (Italian: La cavalcata ardente) is a 1925 Italian silent film directed by Carmine Gallone and starring Emilio Ghione.

Cast
Soava Gallone
Emilio Ghione
Jeanne Brindeau
Americo de Giorgio
Gabriel de Gravone
Ciro Galvani
Umberto Ledda
Ignazio Lupi
Alfredo Martinelli
Giuseppe Pierozzi
Fosco Risturi
Marcella Sabbatini
Raimondo Van Riel

References

External links

Films directed by Carmine Gallone
Italian silent feature films
Italian black-and-white films